Ambrosius Eßer OP (born Klaus Eßer, also spelled Eszer, or Esser,  19 November 1933, Düsseldorf –  12 April 2010, Berlin) was a German church historian and member of the Dominican Order. He died of a pulmonary embolism.

Eszer served for many years as professor at the Pontifical University of St. Thomas Aquinas, Angelicum in Rome, Italy.

Honours 
  1987: Great Cross of Merit of the Federal Republic of Germany
  1996: Austrian Cross of Honour for Science and Art, 1st class
  2008: Grand Decoration of Honour in Silver for Services to the Republic of Austria
  2008: Medal Pro Ecclesia et Pontifice

References
Obituary

1933 births
2010 deaths
Writers from Düsseldorf
20th-century German historians
20th-century German Roman Catholic priests
German Dominicans

Commanders Crosses of the Order of Merit of the Federal Republic of Germany
Recipients of the Grand Decoration for Services to the Republic of Austria
Recipients of the Austrian Cross of Honour for Science and Art, 1st class
German male non-fiction writers
Deaths from pulmonary embolism
Clergy from Düsseldorf